The following lists events that happened during 1955 in Singapore.

Incumbents
 Governor:
 until 2 June: Sir John Fearns Nicoll
 2 June-30 June: Sir William Goode 
 starting 30 June: Sir Robert Brown Black
 Chief Minister:  David Marshall
 Colonial Secretary: Sir William Goode (till January 1955)
 Chief Secretary: Sir William Goode (starting February 1955)

Events

January
 1 January - The Singapore Telephone Board (STB) and Telephone Department (TD) are formed after the British Colonial Government terminated Oriental Telephone and Electric Company's licence, thus acquiring its assets. The STB takes control of domestic telephone lines, with the TD controlling trunk and international services.

April
 2 April - Singapore held its first Legislative Assembly elections. The Singapore Labour Front (LF) won the elections, the first where a majority of seats were contested.
 6 April - David Marshall became the first Chief Minister of Singapore.
 7 April - The Ministry of Education is established.
 23 April - The Hock Lee bus workers' strike began.

May
 12 May - The Hock Lee strikes escalated into a riot, resulting in 4 fatalities.

July
 1 July - The Central Provident Fund is formed as a savings scheme to support workers during retirement.

August
 20 August - The Paya Lebar Airport is officially opened, replacing the Kallang Airport which opened on 12 June 1937.

September
 8 September - The Van Kleef Aquarium is opened.
 22 September - To deal with crimes, the Criminal Law (Temporary Provisions) Act is passed, allowing for detentions.

November
 23 November - The administration of Cocos (Keeling) Islands is transferred to Australia after several delays.

December
 10 December - The Asia Insurance Building is opened, then Southeast Asia's tallest building.

Births
 11 July – Balaji Sadasivan, former Senior Minister of State for Foreign Affairs (d. 2010).
 3 October – Yaacob Ibrahim, former politician.
 27 October – Michael Chiang, playwright.
 Lee Wei Ling, neurologist.
 Sim Wong Hoo, founder of Creative Technology.

See also
1955 Singaporean general election
List of years in Singapore

References

 
Singapore
Years in Singapore